Driftglass/Starshards is a 1993 collection of short stories by Samuel R. Delany. The collection contains the entire contents of Delany's 1971 collection, Driftglass, stories from Distant Stars (1981) and others that had not previously been collected.  Many of the stories originally appeared in the magazines Worlds of Tomorrow, The Magazine of Fantasy & Science Fiction, If and New Worlds or the anthologies Quark/3, Dangerous Visions and Alchemy & Academe.

Every story in this collection was later collected in Aye, and Gomorrah, and other stories, except for "Citre et Trans" and "Erik, Gwen, and D.H. Lawrence’s Esthetic of Unrectified Feeling", which were collected in Atlantis: Three Tales.

Contents
 Of Doubts and Dreams
 Part One
 "The Star Pit"
 "Corona"
 "Aye, and Gomorrah..."
 "Driftglass"
 "We, in Some Strange Power’s Employ, Move on a Rigorous Line"
 "Cage of Brass"
 "High Weir"
 "Time Considered as a Helix of Semi-Precious Stones"
 "Omegahelm"
 Part Two
 "Prismatica"
 "Ruins"
 "Dog in a Fisherman’s Net"
 "Night and the Loves of Joe Dicostanzo"
 Part Three
 "Among the Blobs"
 "Citre et Trans"
 "Erik, Gwen, and D.H. Lawrence’s Esthetic of Unrectified Feeling"

References
 
 

1993 short story collections
Fantasy short story collections
Science fiction short story collections
Short story collections by Samuel Delany